Khalil Rehmtullah (born 8 August 1985) is a Tanzanian cricketer. He played in the 2014 ICC World Cricket League Division Five tournament. In July 2018, he was part of Tanzania's squad in the Eastern sub region group for the 2018–19 ICC World Twenty20 Africa Qualifier tournament.

References

External links
 

1985 births
Living people
Tanzanian cricketers
Place of birth missing (living people)